Héctor Pacheco Carrasco (born October 22, 1969) is a former Major League Baseball relief pitcher. He bats and throws right handed.

In a twelve-season career, Carrasco has posted a 44–50 record with 19 saves and a 3.99 ERA in 637 relief appearances and ten starts.

Career
On April 15, while pitching for the Twins, Hector gave up Cal Ripken's 3000th hit in a game at the Hubert H. Humphrey Metrodome. He was 4–3 with a 2.04 ERA in 62.2 innings as a reliever, and 1–1 with a 2.03 ERA in 27 2.3 innings while starting five games near the season's end.

In , Carrasco pitched for the Kintetsu Buffaloes of Japan's Pacific League, going 8–8 with five saves and a 5.57 ERA in 53 relief appearances. He began the 2005 season at the then Washington Nationals' Triple-A affiliate, New Orleans Zephyrs, where he was 1–0 with four saves in eight games without allowing an earned run, before being called up and having a terrific year for the Nats. He made 64 appearances (10th in the league), primarily as the set up man for closer Chad Cordero, pitching  innings, with an ERA of just 2.04, although he also started five games. His WHIP (BB + H per IP) was 1.098, which would have been good enough for fifth in the league had he had the requisite number of innings pitched.

Following the 2005 season, Carrasco filed for free agency, and was signed by the Angels to a $6.1 million, two-year contract. In , Carrasco was 7–3 with a 3.41 ERA in 56 appearances, three as a starter. The following week, Carrasco returned to the Nationals organization by signing a minor league contract. On Jan. 24, Carrasco signed a minor-league contract with an invitation to spring training with the Pirates. He was released on March 26, 2008. In early May, he signed a minor league contract with the Chicago Cubs. He became a free agent at the end of the season.

In 2009 Carrasco played in the Atlantic League for the Newark Bears, the Long Island Ducks and the Bridgeport Bluefish.

Carrasco played with the Shreveport-Bossier Captains of the American Association of Independent Professional Baseball during the 2010 season. He played for the club in 2011 as well.

External links

1969 births
Living people
Asheville Tourists players
Baltimore Orioles players
Boston Red Sox players
Bridgeport Bluefish players
Cincinnati Reds players
Columbus Clippers players
Diablos Rojos del México players
Dominican Republic expatriate baseball players in Canada
Dominican Republic expatriate baseball players in Japan
Dominican Republic expatriate baseball players in Mexico
Dominican Republic expatriate baseball players in the United States
Fort Myers Miracle players
Gulf Coast Mets players
Indianapolis Indians players
Iowa Cubs players
Kane County Cougars players
Kansas City Royals players
Kingsport Mets players
Long Island Ducks players
Los Angeles Angels players
Major League Baseball pitchers
Major League Baseball players from the Dominican Republic
Mexican League baseball pitchers
Minnesota Twins players
New Orleans Zephyrs players
Newark Bears players
Nippon Professional Baseball pitchers
Osaka Kintetsu Buffaloes players
Ottawa Lynx players
Sportspeople from San Pedro de Macorís
Pericos de Puebla players
Petroleros de Minatitlán players
Pittsfield Mets players
Salt Lake Buzz players
Shreveport-Bossier Captains players
Washington Nationals players
Azucareros del Este players
Leones de Ponce players
Dominican Republic expatriate baseball players in Puerto Rico
Toros del Este players